This is a list of all cricketers who have captained the now defunct East African cricket team in an official international match. This includes One Day Internationals and ICC Trophy games.

Overall list

East Africa played its first match in 1951 and was an associate member of the ICC from 1966 to 1989.

One Day International

East Africa played their first ODI on 7 June 1975.

ICC Trophy

East Africa debuted in the ICC Trophy in the 1979 tournament

External links
Cricinfo
East African ICC Trophy captains at Cricket Archive 

Cricket captains
East Africa
East Africa in international cricket